The 1999 Croatian Bol Ladies Open was a women's tennis tournament played on outdoor clay courts in Bol, Croatia that was part of the Tier IV category of the 1999 WTA Tour. It was the sixth edition of the tournament and was held from 26 April until 2 May 1999. Fourth-seeded Corina Morariu won the singles title and earned $22,000 first-prize money.

Finals

Singles

 Corina Morariu defeated  Julie Halard-Decugis 6–2, 6–0
 It was Morariu's only singles title of her career.

Doubles

 Jelena Kostanić /  Michaela Paštiková defeated  Meghann Shaughnessy /  Andreea Vanc 7–5, 6–7(1–7), 6–2

Entrants

Seeds

Other entrants
The following players received wildcards into the singles main draw:
  Tina Pisnik
  Ivana Bračun

The following players received entry from the singles qualifying draw:

  Luciana Masante
  Renata Kučerová
  Lucie Ahl
  Zuzana Hejdová

The following player received entry as a lucky loser:

  Amanda Grahame

See also
 1999 Croatia Open

External links
 ITF tournament edition details
 Tournament draws

Croatian Bol Ladies Open
Croatian Bol Ladies Open
1999 in Croatian tennis
1999 in Croatian women's sport